Henry Morgan Taylor (5 February 1889 – 20 June 1955) was a sportsman who played rugby union for New Zealand and cricket Canterbury. He played for the All BlacksNew Zealand's national rugby union team in 1913 and 1914, and provincial cricket for Canterbury from 1919 to 1920. Taylor appeared in three first-class matches as a wicket-keeper. He scored 40 runs, once he reached the 32 score.

Taylor was born and died in Christchurch, New Zealand.

Notes

1889 births
1955 deaths
New Zealand cricketers
Canterbury cricketers
New Zealand international rugby union players
New Zealand rugby union players
Rugby union players from Christchurch
Canterbury rugby union players
Wicket-keepers